Chloe Marr is a 1946 comedy novel by the British writer A.A. Milne. It was the last of a handful of novels written by Milne, better known for his plays and his short stories about Winnie the Pooh.

Synopsis
During the Interwar period Chloe Marr, a celebrated Mayfair society beauty plays off her many suitors against each other but nurses a deep secret.

References

Bibliography
 Cohen, Nadia. The Extraordinary Life of A. A. Milne. Grub Street Publishers, 2017.
 Haring-Smith, Tori. A.A. Milne: A Critical Bibliography. Garland, 1982. 
 Shaw, Bruce. Jolly Good Detecting: Humor in English Crime Fiction of the Golden Age. McFarland, 2013.

1946 British novels
Novels by A. A. Milne
British comedy novels
Novels set in London
Novels set in the 1920s
Methuen Publishing books